Peter Tom Willis (born January 4, 1967) is a former college and professional American football quarterback. From 1998–2008 he served as the radio color commentator for the Florida State University Seminoles, where he played his collegiate football.

Willis lives in Valrico, Florida and is an industrial buyer for Commercial Metals Company at their Tampa facility.

College career
Originally from Morris, Alabama and Mortimer Jordan High School, Willis was inducted as a member of the Florida State University Sports Hall of Fame in 1998. During his successful senior year in 1989 (his first and only season as the starting quarterback), he led the team to 10 straight victories, including an impressive 41–17 win over the Nebraska Cornhuskers in the Fiesta Bowl.  It was also during that year that he set 15 team passing records. He surpassed fellow Seminole Hall of Famer Gary Huff to become Florida State's top single season passer with 3,124 yards. He also set the record for passes completed in a season (211), most 300-yard passing games (six), as well as touchdown passes in a game (six). Willis also set five Florida State career records including best passing efficiency at 148.5.

Willis' senior season saw the Seminoles lose their first two games before coming back with 10-straight wins over the likes of Syracuse, Auburn, Miami and Florida. On a team that many considered the nation's best at year's end, Willis helped put the exclamation point on that notion with a 41–17 win over Nebraska in the Fiesta Bowl.

Professional career
After college, Willis played professional football for the National Football League's Chicago Bears and the Tampa Bay Storm of the Arena Football League.

Commentating career
Willis worked in the broadcast booth as a color analyst with "the voice of the Seminoles", long time FSU play-by-play announcer Gene Deckerhoff. His signature was to praise a player's performance by saying "I see you, (name of player)!" Following ten years of service, his contract was not renewed after the 2007–2008 football season because the Florida State administration and coaches felt he was "too critical" of the program. Head coach Bobby Bowden stood by this decision, and said "I do support it. I support it all the way."

"They felt like I was too critical of the program and the team the last few years," Willis said. "I hate that. That was not my intent. My intent was to call it like I see it for 10 years. But if people are upset with me because I was telling the truth, if that's going to upset people, maybe I shouldn't be there."

Willis is a member of the FSU Sports Hall of Fame and a former quarterback who led the Seminoles to a 10–2 record and No. 3 ranking in 1989. He was critical of the offense under former coordinator Jeff Bowden, and regretted saying that the Seminoles resembled a "high school offense" during the 2005 game at Clemson. That comment especially upset coach Bobby Bowden, according to sources. Willis believed that the program, with the hiring of Jimbo Fisher, was headed in the right direction.

References

External links
NFL stats
AFL stats

1967 births
Living people
People from Jefferson County, Alabama
American football quarterbacks
Florida State Seminoles football players
Florida State University alumni
Chicago Bears players
Tampa Bay Storm players
American sports announcers
Players of American football from Alabama
People from Valrico, Florida
Tampa Bay Buccaneers players